The Missouria or Missouri (in their own language, Niúachi, also spelled Niutachi) are a Native American tribe that originated in the Great Lakes region of what is now the United States before European contact. The tribe belongs to the Chiwere division of the Siouan language family, together with the Iowa and Otoe.

Historically, the tribe lived in bands near the mouth of the Grand River at its confluence with the Missouri River; the mouth of the Missouri at its confluence with the Mississippi River, and in present-day Saline County, Missouri. Since Indian removal, today they live primarily in Oklahoma. They are federally recognized as the Otoe-Missouria Tribe of Indians, based in Red Rock, Oklahoma.

Name
French colonists adapted a form of the Illinois language-name for the people: Wimihsoorita.  Their name means "One who has dugout canoes". In their own Siouan language, the Missouri call themselves Niúachi, also spelled Niutachi, meaning "People of the River Mouth." The Osage called them the Waçux¢a, and the Quapaw called them the Wa-ju'-xd¢ǎ.

The state of Missouri and the Missouri River are named for the tribe.

History

The tribe's oral history tells that they once lived north of the Great Lakes. They began migrating south in the 16th century. By 1600, the Missouria lived near the confluence of the Grand and Missouri rivers, where they settled through the 18th century. Their tradition says that they split from the Otoe tribe, which belongs to the same Chiwere branch of the Siouan language, because of a love affair between the children of two tribal chiefs.

The 17th century brought hardships to the Missouria. The Sauk and Fox frequently attacked them.  Their society was even more disrupted by the high fatalities from epidemics of smallpox and other Eurasian infectious diseases that accompanied contact with Europeans. The French explorer Jacques Marquette contacted the tribe in 1673 and paved the way for trade with the French.

The Missouria migrated west of the Missouri River into Osage territory. During this time, they acquired horses and hunted bison. The French explorer Étienne de Veniard, Sieur de Bourgmont visited the people in the early 1720s. He married the daughter of a Missouria chief. They settled nearby, and Veniard created alliances with the people. He built Fort Orleans in 1723 as a trading post near present-day Brunswick, Missouri. It was occupied until 1726.

In 1730, an attack by the Sauk/Fox tribe nearly destroyed the Missouria, killing hundreds. Most survivors reunited with the Otoe, while some joined the Osage and Kansa. After a smallpox outbreak in 1829, fewer than 100 Missouria survived, and they all joined the Otoe.

They signed treaties with the US government in 1830 and 1854 to cede their lands in Missouri.  They relocated to the Otoe-Missouria reservation, created on the Big Blue River at the Kansas-Nebraska border. The US pressured the two tribes into ceding more lands in 1876 and 1881.

In 1880, the tribes split into two factions, the Coyote, who were traditionalists, and the Quakers, who were assimilationists. The Coyote settled on the Iowa Reservation in Indian Territory. The Quakers negotiated a small separate reservation in Indian Territory. By 1890. most of the Coyote band rejoined the Quakers on their reservation. Under the Dawes Act, by 1907 members of the tribes were registered and allotted individual plots of land per household. The U.S. declared any excess communal land of the tribe as "surplus" and sold it to European-American settlers. The tribe merged with the Otoe tribe.

The Curtis Act required the disbanding of tribal courts and governments in order to assimilate the people and prepare the territory for statehood, but the tribe created their own court system in 1900. The Missouria were primarily farmers in the early 20th century. After oil was discovered on their lands in 1912, the U.S. government forced many of the tribe off their allotments.

Population
According to the ethnographer James Mooney, the population of the tribe was about 200 families in 1702; 1000 people in 1780; 300 in 1805; 80 in 1829, when they were living with the Otoe; and 13 in 1910. Since then, their population numbers are combined with those of the Otoe.

Notes

References
 Pritzer, Barry M. A Native American Encyclopedia: History, Culture, and Peoples. Oxford: Oxford University Press, 2000.

External links

 History of Missouri Indian Tribes, Access Genealogy, extracts for Missouria from John R. Swanton, The Indian Tribes of North America, Bureau of American Ethnology, Bulletin 145, Washington, DC: US Government Printing Office, 1953.
 Otoe-Missouria Genealogy

Siouan peoples
Great Lakes tribes
Native American tribes in Missouri
Native American tribes in Oklahoma
Algonquian ethnonyms